Cerkvišče is a settlement in the Municipality of Črnomelj in the White Carniola area of southeastern Slovenia. It lies in the area between the right bank of the Lahinja River and the left bank of the Kolpa. It is part of the traditional region of Lower Carniola and is now included in the Southeast Slovenia Statistical Region.

References

External links
Cerkvišče on Geopedia

Populated places in the Municipality of Črnomelj